Cuban boat people mainly refers to refugees who flee Cuba by boat and ship to the United States.

History 
Migrants from Cuba to the United States since the time Fidel Castro rose to power under a Communist regime, have strongly influenced U.S foreign policy concerns through special humanitarian provisions of the law, which has led to various public sentiments.

First boat arrivals, 1961–1965 
The first major wave of Cuban boat people came after the failure of the Bay of Pigs Invasion and the Cuban Missile Crisis, which ended a "temporary exile status" period of commercial air travel between the United States and Cuba, which was positively received by the American public. This had seen a score of roughly 125,000 Cuban exiles reach U.S. soil that were to return upon an overthrown Castro regime that never happened.

During this time, the United States Coast Guard would make no attempt to turn back undocumented Cubans who were usually arriving in small boats. Afterwards, Cubans who wished to come to the United States, would have to do so illegally by crossing the Florida Straits, or travel to other countries. Between 1962 and 1965 around 6,700 Cubans arrived in Florida in makeshift boats and other vessels. Emigrants were not given a process of migration until the Camarioca boatlift in 1965.

"Marielitos" (1973–1980) 

As relations with Cuba slowly and steadily improved, a foreign policy that enacted a  migration intervention to begin a 7-year program of passages called the Mariel boatlift, which was perceived to 'aid Cuba at ridding itself of undesirables', was met with little public support. After stages of these initial trips, Vice President Walter Mondale of the Carter administration served to justify this political position by stating there "is no better proof of the failure of Castro's revolution than the dramatic exodus which is currently taking place." There was a growing stigma that surrounded marielitos as they were not viewed as romantically as the initial exiles. Even though President Jimmy Carter welcomed migrants in with open arms, it was not well received, as the image of a criminal grew rampant among the public eye, even though it were only about 10-20% of them. Castro had called these people the escoria ("scum") of his country: the "homosexuals, drug addicts, and gambling addicts".

"Balseros" (1993–1995) 

After years of decline since the Mariel boatlift, a few thousand Cuban boat people had made their way to the U.S. in 1993 after a rise from a few hundred in 1989. After riots ensued in Havana after threatening speeches made by Castro in 1994, he announced that any Cuban who wished to leave the island could. Around 35,000 rafters left the island after the announcement and 40,000 Cubans in total were intercepted by the U.S. Coast Guard that year.

U.S. President Bill Clinton announced that any rafters intercepted at sea would be detained  at the Guantanamo Bay Naval Base. Around 31,000 rafters would be detained at the base, which became known as the Balsero crisis. These "Balseros" as these boat people were known during this time, were known to wash up to shore at the Floridian coast on any conceivable thing that could float such as on wooden rafts or truck tires.

Victims of "13 de Marzo" v. Cuba 
A complaint was filed with the Inter-American Commission on Human Rights on July 19, 1994 regarding an old tugboat with 72 people on board, who were attempting to flee Cuba hours before dawn on July 13 [1994], who were attacked with pressurized water hose equipment just 7 miles off the coast of Cuba by 4 boats organized by the Cuban State. The boat named 13 de Marzo, eventually sank with a death toll of 41, which included 10 minors after the cries of women and children for it to stop were in vain.

The Cuban government argued that 13 de Marzo was stolen at a dock and that authorities were attempting to intercept it. Days following the tragedy, the Cuban government were requested to recover the bodies from the bottom of the sea but declined citing the lack of experienced divers. Instead, a nonprofit organization named Hermanos al Rescate (Brothers to the Rescue), whose mission is to rescue boat people attempting to leave Cuba, made a request to the Cuban government to recover these bodies themselves but were denied.

Wet feet, dry feet policy
In an attempt to control the influx of boat people, the Clinton administration agreed to grant 20,000 visas annually for Cubans who wished asylum, which became known as the wet feet, dry feet policy.

End of an Era 
Fearing that the end of the wet feet, dry feet policy was near after an announcement by Barack Obama in December 2014 regarding possible changes to the Cuban Adjustment Act, there was an increased concern by the U.S. Coast Guard about a possible spike in boat people, which they had intercepted an increased 117% more Cubans in 2014 than the previous year.

In 2017, the wet feet, dry feet policy finally came to an end. Fewer Cubans attempted to make the journey to the United States. Those who manage to arrive in Florida would only be able to remain legally by applying for political asylum.

See also
 Haitian boat people

References

External links 
Constitutional Rights Foundation (CRF): Educating About Immigration: History Lesson 9: Refugees from the Caribbean: Cuban and Haiti "Boat People".

Cuban-American history
Cuba–United States relations
Cuban diaspora
Cuban exiles
Cuban refugees
Migrant crises
Refugees in the United States